Union Township is one of the twenty-two townships of Knox County, Ohio, United States.  The 2010 census found 2,646 people in the township, 1,477 of whom lived in the unincorporated portions of the township.

Geography
Located in the eastern part of the county, it borders the following townships:
Jefferson Township - north
Richland Township, Holmes County - northeast
Tiverton Township, Coshocton County - east
Newcastle Township, Coshocton County - southeast corner
Butler Township - south
Harrison Township - southwest corner
Howard Township - west
Brown Township - northwest

Two incorporated villages are located in Union Township: Danville in the northwest, and Gann (Brinkhaven) in the northeast.

Name and history
Union Township was organized in 1808.

It is one of twenty-seven Union Townships statewide.

Government
The township is governed by a three-member board of trustees, who are elected in November of odd-numbered years to a four-year term beginning on the following January 1. Two are elected in the year after the presidential election and one is elected in the year before it. There is also an elected township fiscal officer, who serves a four-year term beginning on April 1 of the year after the election, which is held in November of the year before the presidential election. Vacancies in the fiscal officership or on the board of trustees are filled by the remaining trustees.

References

External links
County website

Townships in Knox County, Ohio
Townships in Ohio